Newtown Hardware House is an independently owned hardware store located at 106 S. State Street, Newtown, Bucks County, Pennsylvania. The Newtown Hardware House is a contributing property of the Newtown Historic District which was listed on the National Register of Historic Places in 1979.

History 
The Newtown Hardware House was built in 1869 by Cyrus Hillborn and Harrison C. Worstall at 106-108 South State Street. 108 South State Street was a hardware store operated by Hillborn and Worstall, and 106 South State Street was a dry goods store operated by George E. Dolton. Mr. Dolton sold his side to George H. McMaster in 1908. When McMaster died in 1927, both sides of the store were taken over by H.C. Worstall, and later bought out by John J. Burns. When Burns died in 1955, Robert M. Davis bought the business and operated it until 1985, when it was taken over by C. David Callahan.  In 2012, C. David Callahan sold the business to William Newell of Newtown and remained on as a part-time employee.

Fire
The Newtown Hardware House was destroyed by fire on March 1, 1899. In addition to the Hardware store another store was completely burned. The loss was estimated at $80,000. The fire was one of the worst in Newtown's history. It is thought burglars set the building on fire. The building was rebuilt to the exact specifications of the original building and was reopened by Christmas of the same year and is still in operation. Today, when looking at the rear wall, lower left (northern) portion of the structure, a distinct brick line exists that outlines surviving brickwork dating before 1899.

Oldest business in Newtown Pennsylvania
The Newtown Hardware House has been in continuous operation for over 151 years, which ranks as the longest tenure for any single business in Newtown. The hardware store announced it was going out of business in 2012: City residents heard about the possibility that the hardware store may go out of business, so they organized a "Cash mob": a crowd of people arrived at the business to pump up sales. In 2011 the store was in trouble, and by 2012 the store's owner Dave Callahan decided to go out of business. Bill and Peggy Newell took over the hardware store. They purchased the business from Dave Callahan.

See also
Newtown Historic District (Newtown, Pennsylvania)
Newtown, Bucks County, Pennsylvania

References

External links
Newton Hardware House

Hardware stores of the United States
1869 establishments in Pennsylvania
Commercial buildings completed in 1869
National Register of Historic Places in Bucks County, Pennsylvania